Danforth is a village in Danforth Township, Iroquois County, Illinois, United States. The population was 604 at the 2010 census.

History
Danforth was laid out in 1872 when the railroad was extended to that point. It mainly started out with most of the population being farmers and their families. The village was named for its founder, George M. Danforth.

Geography
Danforth is located in northwestern Iroquois County at  (40.820929, -87.979278). U.S. Route 45 passes through the center of the village, leading north  to Ashkum and south the same distance to Gilman.

Demographics

As of the census of 2000, there were 587 people, 202 households, and 131 families residing in the village. The racial makeup of the village was 98.47% White, 0.17% Asian, 0.34% Pacific Islander, 0.68% from other races, and 0.34% from two or more races. Hispanic or Latino of any race were 1.53% of the population.

There were 202 households, out of which 32.2% had children under the age of 18 living with them, 52.0% were married couples living together, 8.9% had a female householder with no husband present, and 34.7% were non-families. 33.2% of all households were made up of individuals, and 19.3% had someone living alone who was 65 years of age or older.  The average household size was 2.38 and the average family size was 3.01.

In the village, the population was spread out, with 21.8% under the age of 18, 6.5% from 18 to 24, 22.1% from 25 to 44, 17.2% from 45 to 64, and 32.4% who were 65 years of age or older.  The median age was 45 years. For every 100 females, there were 78.4 males.  For every 100 females age 18 and over, there were 69.4 males.

The median income for a household in the village was $35,341, and the median income for a family was $48,125. Males had a median income of $31,786 versus $23,036 for females. The per capita income for the village was $17,754.  About 1.5% of families and 1.3% of the population were below the poverty line, including 1.6% of those under age 18 and none of those age 65 or over.

References

Villages in Iroquois County, Illinois
Villages in Illinois